The Stardust Best Drama Actor is chosen by the readers of the annual Stardust magazine. The award honours a star that has made an impact with their acting in that certain film.

List of winners
2011 Hrithik Roshan for Guzaarish as Ethan Mascarenhas
Abhishek Bachchan for Khelein Hum Jee Jaan Sey
Amitabh Bachchan for Rann
Ranbir Kapoor for Raajneeti
Shah Rukh Khan for My Name Is Khan
Sanjay Dutt for Lamhaa
2012 Hrithik Roshan for Zindagi Na Milegi Dobara as Arjun Saluja
Amitabh Bachchan for Aarakshan as Prabhakar Anand
Saif Ali Khan for Aarakshan as  Deepak Kumar
Salman Khan for Bodyguard as Bodyguard Lovely Singh
Ranbir Kapoor for Rockstar as Janardhan "Jordan" Jakhar / JJ
2013 Hrithik Roshan for Agneepath as  Vijay Deenanath Chauhan
Paresh Rawal for OMG – Oh My God!
Ranbir Kapoor for Barfi!
Saif Ali Khan for Cocktail
2015 Shahid Kapoor for Haider as Haider
Amitabh Bachchan for Bhoothnath Returns
Naseeruddin Shah for Dedh Ishqiya
Randeep Hooda for Highway
'2018 Ayushmann Khurrana for Bareilly Ki Barfi as Chirag Dubey
Salman Khan for Tiger Zinda HaiAjay Devgn for Golmaal AgainVarun Dhawan for Badrinath Ki Dulhania''

See also 
 Stardust Awards
 Bollywood
 Cinema of India

References

External links

Stardust Awards